Konradsen is a Norwegian musical duo founded by musicians Jenny Marie Sabel and Eirik Vildgren. They are both originally from northern Norway, but by the release of their debut album had relocated to Oslo.

The group released its debut album, Saints & Sebastian Stories, on October 25, 2019, which was awarded the Norwegian Grammy Awards in the category indie/alternative. A follow-up EP was released on May 1, 2020, also on the label Cascine.

Discography
Saints & Sebastian Stories (Cascine, 2019)
Rodeo No. 5 EP (Cascine, 2020)
You Can Be Loved EP (Ulyssa, 2021)

External links 
 Konradsen on Facebook
 Konradsen on Discogs
 Konradsen on Bandcamp

Reviews 

 Pitchfork
 Line of Best Fit
 Clash
 When the Horn Blows
 Hypebeast

References

Norwegian indie pop groups
Cascine artists